Verticordia sect. Verticordia is one of eleven sections in the subgenus Verticordia. It includes eight species of plants in the genus Verticordia. When Johannes Conrad Schauer described other subgenera in Verticordia, subgenus Verticordia became an autonym after Augustin de Candolle who described the genus in 1828. When Alex George reviewed the genus in 1991, he took the name of this section from that of the subgenus.

The type species for this section is Verticordia plumosa and the other seven species are V. crebra, V. helichrysantha, V. stenopetala, V. sieberi, V. harveyi, V. pityrhops and V. fimbrilepis.

References 

Verticordia
Rosids of Western Australia
Plant sections